Éva Risztov (born 30 August 1985) is a Hungarian Olympic gold medalist female swimmer.

She won four silver medals at the 2002 European Aquatics Championships and three silver medals at the 2003 World Aquatics Championships. She won a further silver medal at the 2004 European Aquatics Championships and competed at the 2004 Summer Olympics where she came 4th in 400 m individual medley. At the European Short Course Swimming Championships she won six gold medals, one silver medal and one bronze medal between 2002 and 2004.

She retired in 2005, but announced her comeback in 2009 as an open water swimmer and she competed at the 2010 European Aquatics Championships in Women's 10 km where she came 7th.

At the 2012 Summer Olympics in London she competed in the 400 metre freestyle (16th), 800 metre freestyle (13th), 4 × 100 metre freestyle relay (15th) and the 10 kilometre marathon, in which she won the gold medal, having dominated the race from the outset.

Achievements
 Olympic Games
 Olympic Champion in 2012 (10 km marathon)
 4th place in 2004 (400 m individual medley)
 World Championships
 2003 3 Silver medals (in 400 m freestyle, 200 m butterfly, 400 m individual medley)
 European LC Championships
 2002 4 Silver medals (in 400 m freestyle, 200 m butterfly, 400 m individual medley, 800 m freestyle)
 2004 1 Silver medal (in 400 m individual medley)
 2012 1 Silver medal, 1 Bronze medal (in 1500 m medley and in 800 m individual medley)
 2014 1 Silver medal (10 km marathon)
 European SC Championships
 2002: 3 Gold medals (in 400 m freestyle, 800 m freestyle, 200 m butterfly); 1 Silver medal (in 400 m individual medley
 2003: 2 Gold medals (in 200 m butterfly, 400 m individual medley), 1 Bronze medal (in 800 m freestyle)
2004: 1 Gold medal (in 400 m individual medley)
 58 times Hungarian champion.

Other interests
She is interested in different sports and physical activities. She tried motocross, skiing, yoga, jetski.

She is fond of abandoned dogs and supports them with collecting textiles and taking care of them regularly.

Awards
 Hungarian swimmer of the Year (3): 2002, 2003, 2012
  Cross of Merit of the Republic of Hungary – Silver Cross (2004)
 Best Hungarian long-distance swimmer of the Year (1): 2010
  Order of Merit of Hungary – Officer's Cross (2012)
 Hajós Alfréd award (2012)
 Swimming World Magazine – Open Water Swimmer of the Year (1): 2012
 Hajdú-Bihar County Príma award (2012)
 Hungarian Sportswoman of the Year (1) – votes of sports journalists: 2012
 Open water swimmer of the year (FINA) (2012)
 Honorary Citizen of Debrecen (2013)

References

External links

 Hungarian Olympic Association on support of yoga 
 Éva Risztov's coach Tibor Kökény
 Swimming at the 2012 Summer Olympics – Women's marathon 10 kilometre

1985 births
Living people
Olympic swimmers of Hungary
Swimmers at the 2000 Summer Olympics
Swimmers at the 2004 Summer Olympics
Swimmers at the 2012 Summer Olympics
Swimmers at the 2016 Summer Olympics
Olympic gold medalists for Hungary
World Aquatics Championships medalists in swimming
Hungarian female freestyle swimmers
Hungarian female butterfly swimmers
Hungarian female medley swimmers
Hungarian female long-distance swimmers
European Aquatics Championships medalists in swimming
Medalists at the 2012 Summer Olympics
People from Hódmezővásárhely
Olympic gold medalists in swimming
Sportspeople from Csongrád-Csanád County
20th-century Hungarian women
21st-century Hungarian women